The Cook Islands youth national handball team is the national Under 19's male handball team of Cook Islands.

History

Youth Olympic Games record

Oceania Handball Nations Cup record

External links
 Official webpage
 Profile on International Handball Federation webpage
 Oceania Continent Handball Federation webpage
  

Men's national youth handball teams
National sports teams of the Cook Islands